Luís Miguel Coimbra Aurélio (born 17 August 1988) is a Portuguese professional footballer who plays as a midfielder.

Club career
Born in Beja, Aurélio played his early years as a senior in the lower leagues, starting with FC Castrense in the regional championships then representing, in quick succession, U.D. Santana, Moreirense FC, Atlético S.C. and C.D. Tondela in the third division. In the 2011–12 season, with the latter club, he contributed 23 games and one goal as it promoted to the second tier for the first time ever.

Aurélio made his professional debut on 12 August 2012, playing the first half of a 2–2 home draw against FC Porto B. He scored a career-best eight goals in that campaign, helping the team easily retain their newly acquired status; highlights included a hat-trick in the 3–0 away victory over S.C. Braga B, on 3 February 2013.

In the 2013 off-season, Aurélio returned to Moreirense who now competed in division two. He netted twice in 19 starts in his first year, in a return to the Primeira Liga after a one-year absence.

Aurélio's maiden appearance in the Portuguese top flight took place on 21 September 2014, when he came as a 68th-minute substitute in a 1–3 away loss to S.L. Benfica. It was to be one of only two competitive matches for the Guimarães-based side, as in January 2015 he left to sign with C.D. Nacional.

In his first full season in Madeira, Aurélio scored three times from 28 games, helping to an 11th-place finish. In the following summer, the free agent joined C.D. Feirense also in the top division.

Aurélio spent the following years in the Romanian Liga I, with CS Gaz Metan Mediaș and CFR Cluj.

International career
In April 2009, whilst at Santana, Aurélio was called to the Portuguese under-21 side by manager Rui Caçador. He never won any caps at any level, however.

Personal life
Aurélio's twin brother, João, was also a footballer and a midfielder. He played most of his career with Nacional, where they shared teams.

Honours
Moreirense
Segunda Liga: 2013–14

CFR Cluj
Liga I: 2019–20, 2020–21

References

External links

1988 births
Living people
People from Beja, Portugal
Portuguese twins
Twin sportspeople
Sportspeople from Beja District
Portuguese footballers
Association football midfielders
Primeira Liga players
Liga Portugal 2 players
Segunda Divisão players
C.D. Beja players
Moreirense F.C. players
C.D. Tondela players
C.D. Nacional players
C.D. Feirense players
Associação Académica de Coimbra – O.A.F. players
Liga I players
CS Gaz Metan Mediaș players
CFR Cluj players
Portuguese expatriate footballers
Expatriate footballers in Romania
Portuguese expatriate sportspeople in Romania